The wooden spoon is the imaginary and ironic "award" which is said to be won by the team finishing in last place in the Australian Football League. No physical wooden spoon award exists, other than those brought by opposition fans to taunt struggling teams, nor is such an award officially sanctioned by the VFL/AFL. However, most betting agencies will take wagers on the wooden spoon.

Criteria
The team which finishes on the bottom of the ladder wins the wooden spoon. This is determined by:
 Fewest premiership points (four points for a win, two points for a draw)
 Lowest percentage (the ratio of points for to points against if on same numbers of points)
No countback exists if teams finish equal on points but with a different number of wins.

1901–1907
From 1901 to 1907, the VFL season was set up such that each team played fourteen regular season games: two games against each opponent. Based upon regular season ladder positions, teams were divided into pools A (1st, 3rd, 5th and 7th) and B (2nd, 4th, 6th and 8th), and each team played the opponents from its pool once each in the "sectional round."

Following the sectional round, the results of these matches were added to the ladder to give a final ladder based on seventeen matches per team. As such, the wooden spooner is considered to be the team which finishes last after all seventeen matches.

The three sectional games changed the outcome of the wooden spoon twice in the seven seasons of this format: in 1905, St Kilda beat Geelong in their last game, relegating Melbourne to last, and in 1907, Fitzroy won all three of their games, relegating Essendon to last.

1916
In the 1916, only four teams (Carlton, Collingwood, Fitzroy and Richmond) competed due to World War I. Fitzroy finished last after the home-and-away season with a record of 2–9–1 (10 pts), and Richmond finished third with a record of 5–7–0 (20 pts).

All four teams competed in the finals under the amended Argus system in place at the time. Richmond lost their Semi-Final and finished in overall last place as the lowest placed Semi-Final loser, while Fitzroy won their Semi-Final, the Final and the Grand Final to win the premiership.

This has created uncertainty to some extent regarding which club won the 1916 wooden spoon: by analogy with the minor and major premierships, it could be said that Fitzroy won the "minor wooden spoon" and Richmond won the "major wooden spoon".

In this regard, the official AFL Season Guide recognises Richmond as the wooden spooners for the 1916 VFL season, while the Football Record in 1917–1923 listed the four clubs' positions for 1916 as Fitzroy, Carlton, Collingwood and Richmond.

Wooden spoons by season

Wooden spoons by club

Bold indicates clubs currently playing in the AFL.

Longest wooden spoon droughts 
Note: These are a ranking of streaks, not a ranking of biggest streaks by club.

Active wooden spoon droughts

AFL Women's

References and Notes

External links
 AFL Wooden Spoon Awardees

 
Wooden spoons
Wooden spoons